A total lunar eclipse occurred at the Moon's descending node on 27 July 2018. The Moon passed through the center of Earth's shadow in what was the first central lunar eclipse since 15 June 2011. It was also the second total lunar eclipse in 2018, after the one on 31 January. It was the longest total lunar eclipse of the 21st century, but not the longest in the 3rd millennium. The longest total lunar eclipse of the 3rd millennium will occur on May 12, 2264, lasting 106 minutes and 13.2 seconds, which will be the longest total lunar eclipse since 2000, and the longest one until 3107.

The eclipse occurred when the Moon was near its maximum distance from Earth, which caused the Moon to appear smaller than normal (a phenomenon sometimes called a micromoon), and to travel at its slowest speed in its orbit around Earth. This was the longest total lunar eclipse that occurred in the 21st century, but not the longest in the 3rd millennium. Totality lasted one hour and 42.955 minutes, a period "just short of the theoretical limit of a lunar eclipse (one hour and 46.605 minutes)". The Moon remained at least partially in Earth's shadow for three hours 54.55 minutes.

This lunar eclipse coincided with Mars being nearly as close as possible to Earth, a concurrence that happens once every 25,000 years.

Background

A lunar eclipse occurs when the Moon passes within Earth's umbra (shadow). As the eclipse begins, Earth's shadow first darkens the Moon slightly. Then, the Earth's shadow begins to cover part of the Moon, typically turning it a dark red-brown color (the color can vary based on atmospheric conditions). The Moon appears to be reddish because of Rayleigh scattering (the same effect that causes sunsets to appear reddish and the daytime sky to appear blue) and the refraction of that light by Earth's atmosphere into its umbra.

The Moon's brightness is exaggerated within the umbral shadow. The southern portion of the Moon was closest to the center of the shadow, making it the darkest, and most red in appearance.

Visibility

The lunar eclipse was completely visible over Eastern Africa, Southern Africa, Southern Asia and Central Asia, seen rising over South America, Western Africa, and Europe, and setting over Eastern Asia, and Australia.

Observations

Related eclipses

Eclipses of 2018 
 A total lunar eclipse on 31 January.
 A partial solar eclipse on 15 February.
 A partial solar eclipse on 13 July.
 A total lunar eclipse on 27 July.
 A partial solar eclipse on 11 August.

Lunar year series

Saros series

It last occurred on July 16, 2000 and will next occur on August 7, 2036.

This is the 38th member of Lunar Saros 129. The previous event was the July 2000 lunar eclipse. The next event is the August 2036 lunar eclipse. Lunar Saros 129 contains 11 total lunar eclipses between 1910 and 2090. Solar Saros 136 interleaves with this lunar saros with an event occurring every 9 years 5 days alternating between each saros series.

Half-Saros cycle
A lunar eclipse will be preceded and followed by solar eclipses by 9 years and 5.5 days (a half saros). This lunar eclipse is related to two total solar eclipses of Solar Saros 136.

Related eclipses

Inex 
 Preceded: Lunar eclipse of August 17, 1989

 Followed: Lunar eclipse of July 7, 2047

Tritos 
 Preceded: Lunar eclipse of August 28, 2007

 Followed: Lunar eclipse of June 26, 2029

Tzolkinex 
 Preceded: Lunar eclipse of June 15, 2011

 Followed: Lunar eclipse of September 7, 2025

Half-Saros cycle 
 Preceded: Solar eclipse of July 22, 2009

 Followed: Solar eclipse of August 2, 2027

See also
List of lunar eclipses and List of 21st-century lunar eclipses

Notes

External links

 Where to see the eclipse and public events (Go Stargazing) 
 
 Hermit eclipse: 2018-07-27
Photo Reveals a Lunar Eclipse Like Never Before

2018-07
2018-07
2018 in science
July 2018 events